San Isidro is a canton in the Heredia province of Costa Rica. The head city is in San Isidro district.

History 
San Isidro was created on 13 July 1905 by decree 40.

Geography 
San Isidro has an area of  km² and a mean elevation of  metres.

The canton is in the highlands northeast of the provincial capital city of Heredia. The Pará Blanca River forms its far northeastern border.

Districts 
The canton of San Isidro is subdivided into the following districts:
 San Isidro
 San José
 Concepción
 San Francisco

Demographics 

For the 2011 census, San Isidro had a population of  inhabitants.

Transportation

Road transportation 
The canton is covered by the following road routes:

References 

Cantons of Heredia Province
Populated places in Heredia Province